Percy Melville Thornton (29 December 1841 – 8 January 1918) was a British Conservative politician  and author.

Thornton was the oldest surviving son of Rear Admiral Samuel Thornton (c.1797-1859) & his wife Emily Elizabeth née Rice. His grandfather was the abolitionist MP Samuel Thornton and his uncle was Henry Thornton, founder of the Clapham Sect.

Thornton attended Harrow School and Jesus College, Cambridge. His interest in athletics led to him becoming secretary of Cambridge University Athletics Club in 1863. He was also a keen cricketer, inspired by his cousin Charles Inglis Thornton. From 1871 to 1899, he was Honorary Secretary of Middlesex County Cricket Club.

In 1877, Thornton married his second cousin, Florence Emily Thornton, daughter of the banker Henry Sykes Thornton. In 1880, he took up residence at the family home in Clapham.

Thornton rejected his family's adherence to Liberal politics and became a supporter of the Conservative party. In 1880, he began his writing career with the pamphlet Recovered Thread of England's Foreign Policy, which espoused Conservative policies. Thornton followed this with the three-volume Foreign Secretaries of the Nineteenth Century (1891), Harrow School and its Surroundings''' (1883), The Brunswick Ascension (1887) and The Stuart Dynasty (1890).

At the general election of 1892, Thornton was elected as MP for Clapham. He successfully defended the seat three times before retiring from parliament in 1910. Following his retirement from politics, he was elected to the position of Registrar of the Royal Literary Fund, and wrote an autobiography, Some Things I Have Remembered'' in 1911.

References

External links 

 

Conservative Party (UK) MPs for English constituencies
UK MPs 1892–1895
UK MPs 1895–1900
UK MPs 1900–1906
UK MPs 1906–1910
1841 births
1918 deaths
People educated at Harrow School
Alumni of Jesus College, Cambridge
English writers
English cricketers
Cambridge University cricketers
Middlesex cricketers
Gentlemen of the South cricketers